Patrick Joseph McDonald (born McDonnell; July 29, 1878 – May 16, 1954) was born in Doonbeg, County Clare, Ireland. He competed as an American track and field athlete in a variety of the throwing events. He was a member of the Irish American Athletic Club and of the New York City Police Department, working as a traffic cop in Times Square for many years. He was part of a group of Irish-American athletes known as the "Irish Whales."

Biography

He competed for the United States in the 1912 Summer Olympics held in Stockholm, Sweden in the shot put where he won the gold medal. He also took part in the shot put (both hands) competition where the distance thrown with each hand was added together. This was the only time this event was held in the Olympic program, and McDonald finished second behind teammate Ralph Rose who had finished second to him in the shot competition.

McDonald returned 8 years later after World War I to compete in the 1920 Summer Olympics in Antwerp, Belgium. Here he won the gold medal in the 56 lb weight throw in the second and final time this competition was held in the Olympic program.

Pat McDonald died in 1954 at age 75 and was interred at Gate of Heaven Cemetery in Hawthorne, New York.

He was inducted into the National Track and Field Hall of Fame in 2012.

See also
Mutiny of the Matoika

References

Sources
 
 
 Police Athletes of the Past: Patrick Mcdonald - Spring 3100

External links
Archives of Irish America - NYU
 Sports-reference profile
Olympic biography and photos
Winged Fist Organization

1878 births
1954 deaths
American male shot putters
Athletes (track and field) at the 1912 Summer Olympics
Athletes (track and field) at the 1920 Summer Olympics
Irish male shot putters
New York City Police Department officers
Olympic silver medalists for the United States in track and field
Olympic gold medalists for the United States in track and field
Sportspeople from County Clare
Male weight throwers
Medalists at the 1920 Summer Olympics
Medalists at the 1912 Summer Olympics
Track and field athletes from New York City
Irish emigrants to the United States (before 1923)
Olympic weight throwers
Burials at Gate of Heaven Cemetery (Hawthorne, New York)